The Spirit of Dorsai is a collection of two science fiction stories by American writer Gordon R. Dickson.  It was first published by Ace Books in 1979.  The collection includes linking material and the stories are part of Dickson's Childe Cycle. The first story, "Amanda Morgan", is original to this collection.  The other, "Brothers", originally appeared in the anthology Astounding, edited by Harry Harrison.

Contents

 Prologue
 "Amanda Morgan"
 Interlude
 "Brothers"
 Epilogue

References

1979 short story collections
Short story collections by Gordon R. Dickson